Virgil Young Cook (November 14, 1848 – March 12, 1922) was an American Confederate veteran and planter from Arkansas. He was the richest resident of Independence County by the time of his death.

Early life
Cook was born on November 14, 1848, in Boydsville, Kentucky.

Career
During the American Civil War of 1861–1865, Cook joined the Confederate States Army and served under General Nathan Bedford Forrest. After the war, Cook served as the grand commander of the United Confederate Veterans. He was appointed to the board of directors of the Confederate Veteran by its founding editor, Sumner Archibald Cunningham, who was a close friend.

During the Spanish–American War of 1898, Cook served the colonel of the 2nd Arkansas Regiment. Although he was appointed by Governor Daniel Webster Jones, he "saw no active service."

Cook became a planter in Arkansas in 1867. He eventually owned "thousands of acres." He was also a real estate investor in Batesville.

Death
Cook was married twice. He first married Mildred Ophelia Lamb; they had two sons and four daughters. He later married Sarah B. Lanier. He resided at the Cook-Morrow House in Batesville, Arkansas, and he was a Methodist.

Cook died of "acute indigestion" on March 12, 1922, at 73. He was the richest resident of Independence County by the time of his death.

References

External links
Virgil Young Cook on Find a Grave

1848 births
1922 deaths
People from Graves County, Kentucky
People from Batesville, Arkansas
Confederate States Army officers
American military personnel of the Spanish–American War
American planters